Merrifieldia malacodactylus is a moth of the family Pterophoridae. It is known from Central Asia, Yemen, Mediterranean Europe, Tunisia, Morocco, Anatolia, Syria, Iran, Afghanistan, Iraq, Lebanon, the Palestinian Territories and Russia.

Adults are variable.

The larvae feed on Origanum vulgare, Thymus herba-barona, Lavandula stoechas, Lavandula angustifolia, Lavandula latifolia, Calamintha nepeta, Rosmarius officinalis and Nepeta nepetellae.

References

malacodactylus
Moths described in 1847
Plume moths of Africa
Plume moths of Asia
Plume moths of Europe
Taxa named by Philipp Christoph Zeller